The Bandi language, also known as Bande, Gbande, Gbandi and Gbunde, is a Mande language. It is spoken primarily in Lofa County in northern Liberia by the Gbandi people.

Bandi has six dialects: Hasala, Hembeh, Lukasa, Wawana, Wulukoha, and Tahamba, which is the dialect used for literature. The dialects have a lexical similarity of 96% among one another, and 83% with the most similar dialect of the Mende language.

See also 
 Languages of Liberia

References 

Mande languages
Languages of Liberia